Loudon Love (born Loudon Love Vollbrecht on April 21, 1998) is an American professional basketball player who last played for the Texas Legends of the NBA G League. He played college basketball for the Wright State Raiders.

Early life and high school career
Love's parents got divorced when he was in middle school and he moved from Vermont to Illinois with his mother, Laura Love. Love attended Geneva Community High School, where he competed in basketball and football. As a junior, he averaged 11 points and 6.8 rebounds per game for a 30-win team. Love played offensive tackle on the gridiron and received a scholarship offer from Illinois. In November 2015, Love was injured during the last play of Geneva's 41-22 Class 7A playoff loss to Bradley-Bourbonnais Community High School. An MRI revealed he tore his ACL, forcing him to miss his senior year in basketball. After receiving basketball offers from Northern Illinois, Western Illinois, Northern Kentucky, UMBC, and UMass Lowell, he committed to play under coach Scott Nagy at South Dakota State, and followed him to Wright State when he received the coaching job there. He legally changed his last name from Vollbrecht to Love, his mother's last name, in honor of her sacrifices growing up.

College career
Love was redshirted his first season at Wright State, spending the season trying to lose weight and get in shape by doing intensified workouts and going on a restricted diet. On January 7, 2018, Love scored 25 points and had 17 rebounds and five blocks in a win against Oakland, earning Horizon League freshman of the week honors. As a freshman, he averaged 12.9 points and 9.8 rebounds per game on a team that finished 25-10 and reached the NCAA Tournament. He was named Horizon League Freshman of the Year and Second Team All-Conference. As a sophomore, he averaged 15.1 points and 8.2 rebounds per game and had 12 double-doubles. Love was named to the First Team All-Horizon League and District 12 First Team by the National Association of Basketball Coaches.

On November 9, 2019, Love had 26 points and 14 rebounds in an 85–62 win over Miami (OH). He fractured his elbow during a game against La Salle on November 26 and missed several weeks. Love earned Horizon League player of the week honors on December 31 after a 22-point, 16-rebound performance against Green Bay. Love had 21 points and nine rebounds during a win against Youngstown State on January 18, 2020, though coach Scott Nagy was upset with his performance. He was named Horizon League player of the week on February 17, after contributing 24 points and nine rebounds in a win over UIC. Love was named Horizon League player of the year at the conclusion of the regular season. Love averaged 15.9 points and 9.7 rebounds per game.

On January 9, 2021, Love collected his 1,000th career rebound in a win over Youngstown State. He scored a career-high 34 points and had 11 rebounds on January 30, in a 86-56 victory over Robert Morris Colonials. As a senior, he averaged 16.6 points, 10.1 rebounds, and 1.9 assists per game, shooting 56.5 percent. Love garnered Horizon League player of the year honors for the second consecutive season.

Professional career
On July 16, 2021, Love signed his first professional contract with Stade Rochelais of the Nationale Masculine 1 in France, but did not play for the team. He was selected 10th overall in the 2021 NBA G League draft by the Texas Legends. On January 31, 2022, Love was waived after suffering a season-ending knee injury.

References

External links

Wright State Raiders bio

1998 births
Living people
American men's basketball players
Basketball players from Illinois
Centers (basketball)
People from Geneva, Illinois
Sportspeople from Kane County, Illinois
Texas Legends players
Wright State Raiders men's basketball players